Haplotaxodon is a genus of cichlids endemic to Lake Tanganyika in Africa.

Species
There are currently two recognized species in this genus:
 Haplotaxodon microlepis Boulenger, 1906
 Haplotaxodon trifasciatus T. Takahashi & Nakaya, 1999

References 

 
Perissodini
Cichlid genera
Taxa named by George Albert Boulenger
Taxonomy articles created by Polbot